Lysimachia clethroides, the  gooseneck loosestrife, is a species of flowering plant, traditionally classified in the family Primulaceae. It was transferred to the family Myrsinaceae based on a molecular phylogenetic study, but this family was later merged into the Primulaceae.

Description
This hardy herbaceous perennial resembles a tall speedwell. The stem is upright and rigid. The leaves are scattered, alternate, oblong or broadly lanceolate, about 5 cm wide, 7 to 11 cm long, with entire margins. The flowers are tiny (12 cm wide), grouped in terminal spikes, each flower being snow white, with five petals. The inflorescence is bent with a sparsely haired axis, reaching a length of 0.3 to 0.4 cm. It flowers throughout summer. This plant forms underground stolons. It is a pioneer plant in its natural range.

The specific epithet clethroides means "like alder" (Clethra).

Distribution and habitat
The native range of this plant is China and Japan. It is also found in Russia, Korea, and North America. It prefers deep, rich loam and sheltered positions.

This plant has gained the Royal Horticultural Society's Award of Garden Merit.

Use in culinary and traditional medicine  
In China, most commonly in Chaoshan region, leaves from lysimachia clethroides are used in culinary as leaf vegetable, for making salads, stir-fried dishes, or soups. Leafy greens from the plant are known as pearl vegetable, and they contain low-sodium and high-potassium.  In medicine, lysimachia clethroides are also known as dwarf peach, pearl grass, regulating grass, the ridge grass, ji cocktail, labor injury medicine, stretch lotion, and nine lotus. They are used to treat diarrhea, bruises, sore throat, heat exhaustion, and edema.

Gallery

References

Global species
Plants.USDA

External links

Lysimachia clethroides in Plants for a Future
Missouri Botanical Gardens

clethroides
Flora of Eastern Asia
Flora of China
Flora of the Russian Far East
Leaf vegetables
Plants used in traditional Chinese medicine